John Lewis Gillin (12 October 1871 - 8 December 1958) was an American sociologist, specializing in applied sociology, and the 16th president of the American Sociological Association (in 1926). He was also active in the activities of the American Red Cross.

He held positions as a professor of social sciences in the Iowa University (1907-1912) and then University of Wisconsin (1912-1958).

In 1915 he co-authored, with Frank Wilson Blackmar, Outlines of sociology, described as "the first widely used introductory text" on sociology.

He was the father of John Philip Gillin (John P. Gillin), an anthropologist.

Works 

 Outlines of sociology, 1915 (with Frank Wilson Blackmar)
 Poverty and dependency. Their relief and prevention, 1926
 Criminology and Penology, 1929
 Introduction to Sociology, 1942 (with John P. Gillin)
 Cultural Sociology, 1948  (with John P. Gillin)

References

External links 

 Gillin's biography at ASA

1871 births
1958 deaths
American sociologists
Presidents of the American Sociological Association
University of Iowa faculty
University of Wisconsin–Madison faculty